Mačkovec pri Suhorju ( or ) is a small settlement in the foothills of the Gorjanci Hills in the Municipality of Metlika  in the White Carniola area of southeastern Slovenia. It is part of the traditional region of Lower Carniola and is now included in the Southeast Slovenia Statistical Region.

Name
The name of the settlement was changed from Mačkovec to Mačkovec pri Suhorju in 1955.

References

External links
Mačkovec pri Suhorju on Geopedia

Populated places in the Municipality of Metlika